Euriphene moloukou is a butterfly in the family Nymphalidae. It is found in the Central African Republic.

References

Butterflies described in 2002
Euriphene
Endemic fauna of the Central African Republic
Butterflies of Africa